Brian Gottfried and Raúl Ramírez were the defending champions, but lost in the first round to Jim Delaney and Sashi Menon.

Ross Case and Geoff Masters defeated John Alexander and Phil Dent in the final, 6–3, 6–4, 3–6, 8–9, 6–4 to win the gentlemen's doubles title at the 1977 Wimbledon Championships. This was Ross and Masters' second Men's Doubles Grand Slam title (after the 1974 Australian Open), and also their last.

Seeds

  Brian Gottfried /  Raúl Ramírez (first round)
  Bob Hewitt /  Frew McMillan (quarterfinals)
  Bob Lutz /  Stan Smith  (third round)
  Fred McNair /  Sherwood Stewart (second round)
  Wojciech Fibak /  Dick Stockton (quarterfinals)
  Marty Riessen /  Roscoe Tanner (quarterfinals)
  Ross Case /  Geoff Masters (champions)
  Charlie Pasarell /  Erik van Dillen (first round)

Draw

Finals

Top half

Section 1

Section 2

Bottom half

Section 3

Section 4

References

External links

1977 Wimbledon Championships – Men's draws and results at the International Tennis Federation

Men's Doubles
Wimbledon Championship by year – Men's doubles